Pola or POLA may refer to:

People
House of Pola, an Italian noble family
Pola Alonso (1923–2004), Argentine actress
Pola Brändle (born 1980), German artist and photographer
Pola Gauguin (1883–1961), Danish painter
Pola Gojawiczyńska (1896–1963), Polish writer
Pola Illéry (born 1908), Romanian actress
Pola Kinski (born 1952), German actress
Pola Negri (1897–1987), Polish actress
Pola Oloixarac, Argentine writer
Pola Raksa (born 1941), Polish actress and singer
Pola Susswein, Holocaust survivor and subject of Pola's March, a 2001 documentary film
Pola Uddin, Baroness Uddin (born 1959), British politician
Spike Pola (1914–2012), Australian rules footballer
Adrián Alonso Pereira (born 1988), Spanish futsal player commonly known as Pola

Places
Pola (Buenos Aires Premetro), a railway station in Villa Lugano, Buenos Aires, Argentina
Pola (Italian province), in the Kingdom of Italy, 1923–1947
Pola, Lesser Poland Voivodeship, in south Poland
Pola, Oriental Mindoro, a municipality in the Philippines
Pola, Russia, a rural locality in Novgorod Oblast, Russia
Pola (river), Russia
Pola, Italian name for Pula, the largest city in Istria, Croatia

Acronyms
Principle of least astonishment, in human–computer interaction
Principle of least authority, in computer security
Port of London Authority, more often referred to as PLA
Port of Los Angeles
POLA, a German factory of plastic model kits for model railroad, since 1997 owned by Faller

Other uses
Italian cruiser Pola, World War II Italian warship
Pola Flotilla, an Imperial Germany Navy formation of the First World War
polA, the bacterial gene encoding DNA polymerase I
Pola (festival), a bull-centered festival in India
Pola (skipper), a genus of skipper butterflies
"Pola" (song), 2019 song by Muniek Staszczyk
Pola (given name)

See also
Pola de Allande, a town and a parish in Allande, Asturias, Spain
Pola de Siero, a town in Asturias
Poland, a country located in Central Europe
Santa Pola, a town in Spain
Pola X, a 1999 French film